San Nicolás is a Chilean town and commune in Punilla Province, Ñuble Region.

Demographics
Of these, 3,428 (35.2%) lived in urban areas and 6,313 (64.8%) in rural areas. Between the 1992 and 2002 censuses, the population grew by 2.6% (246 persons).

Administration
As a commune, San Nicolás is a third-level administrative division of Chile administered by a municipal council, headed by an alcalde who is directly elected every four years. The 2008-2012 alcalde is Víctor Ramón Toro Leiva (PDC).The municipal council has the following members:
 Feliciano Arnoldo Parra Pérez (PDC)
 Elena Rivas Toro (PRI)
 Rogelio Hernandez Gonzalez (PS)
 Luis Antonio Guzmán Álvarez (RN)
 Ramón Toro Leiva (PDC)
 Manuel Bello Núñez (PPD)

Within the electoral divisions of Chile, San Nicolás is represented in the Chamber of Deputies by Jorge Sabag (PDC) and Frank Sauerbaum (RN) as part of the 42nd electoral district, together with San Fabián, Ñiquén, San Carlos, Ninhue, Quirihue, Cobquecura, Treguaco, Portezuelo, Coelemu, Ránquil, Quillón, Bulnes, Cabrero and Yumbel. The commune is represented in the Senate by Alejandro Navarro Brain (MAS) and Hosain Sabag Castillo (PDC) as part of the 12th senatorial constituency (Biobío-Cordillera).

External links
  Municipality of San Nicolás

References

Communes of Chile
Populated places in Punilla Province